Post-fascism is a label that identifies political parties and movements that transition from a fascist political ideology to a more moderate and mainline form of conservatism, abandoning the totalitarian traits of fascism and taking part in constitutional politics

In Italy 
The Italian Social Movement (Movimento Sociale Italiano, MSI) was a neo-fascist political party established in Italy in 1946 by former members of the National Fascist Party and the Republican Fascist Party. Despite being an explicitly fascist party, the MSI included a post-fascist faction headed by Arturo Michelini and Alfredo Covelli, who favoured political cooperation with moderate conservative parties, such as the Christian Democracy, the Monarchist National Party and the Italian Liberal Party.

In 1977 a moderate faction of the MSI led by Covelli split away and established National Democracy (Democrazia Nazionale, DN), the first real post-fascist party in Italy. Covelli attempted to create an alliance between DN and the Christian Democracy, but electoral results were very poor and DN was eventually disbanded in 1979.

The MSI eventually repudiated fascism in a party congress held in Fiuggi in 1995, where the party voted to disband itself and transform into National Alliance (Alleanza Nazionale, AN), a party which has been labeled by several scholars and journalists, including academic Roger Griffin, as a "post-fascist" party. A minority faction in the MSI, led by Pino Rauti, refused to abandon fascism and created a new party called Social Movement Tricolour Flame.

The far-right party Brothers of Italy (Fratelli d'Italia, FdI), which was established in 2012 by several former members of AN and currently leads the government of Italy, has also been described as post-fascist party. However, FdI has also been described as a neo-fascist party.

See also
 In a similar usage, post-communism is used for parties evolved from totalitarian communist parties that partake in the new market democracies of Eastern Europe.

References

Fascism